The Madonna della Vallicella is an oil-on-slate painting produced between 1606 and 1608 by Peter Paul Rubens. It is his second confirmed commission in Rome, after his now-lost painting cycle for Santa Croce in Gerusalemme.

History
The painting was produced as the high-altarpiece for the church of Santa Maria in Vallicella in Rome (also known as the Chiesa Nuova, or "New Church." Rubens reconstructed this image, surrounded by concentric circles of adoring angels and cherubs. On a copper plate placed over the Madonna della Vallicella, Rubens painted an additional Madonna with the Baby Jesus Giving Benediction that mirrors the sacred icon it covers. It's possible to raise the copper plate with a mechanism of pulleys and cords. In the central panel, space seems to expand out of the confines of its frames, a common theme in Baroque painting.

Rubens made a first version on canvas, but it must not have satisfied his clients for how light glared on its surface. So, he painted a new version on a slab of slate, a material with different reflective properties that eliminated the initial inconvenience. 

In the altar niche, Madonna della Vallicella forms a triptych with two other paintings on chalkboard panels that are placed on the nearby walls. The Chiesa Nuova also possesses reliquaries of the depicted saints. The choice of the paintings in the triptych perhaps suggests that Rubens was influenced by an analogous composition choice made by Annibale Carracci in the Chapel Salviati of San Gregorio Magno al Celio for Saint Gregory at Prayer only a few years before.

Rubens, in fact, distanced the two side paintings of saints from the central altar of the church. The side paintings are therefore turned toward the central panel with the venerated Madonna della Vallicella. Their placement directs the devotional gazes of Pope Gregory and Saint Domitilla toward the altar. The paintings of the Chiesa Nuova are the only works Rubens made in Rome that remained in the original locations.

Altar gallery

References

1608 paintings
Paintings by Peter Paul Rubens
Paintings of the Madonna and Child
Paintings in Rome